The umbra, penumbra and antumbra are three distinct parts of a shadow, created by any light source after impinging on an opaque object. Assuming no diffraction, for a collimated beam (such as a point source) of light, only the umbra is cast.

These names are most often used for the shadows cast by celestial bodies, though they are sometimes used to describe levels, such as in sunspots.

Umbra

The umbra (Latin for "shadow") is the innermost and darkest part of a shadow, where the light source is completely blocked by the occluding body. An observer within the umbra experiences a total occultation. The umbra of a round body occluding a round light source forms a right circular cone. When viewed from the cone's apex, the two bodies appear the same size.

The distance from the Moon to the apex of its umbra is roughly equal to that between the Moon and Earth: .

Penumbra 
   
The penumbra (from the Latin paene "almost, nearly") is the region in which only a portion of the light source is obscured by the occluding body. An observer in the penumbra experiences a partial eclipse.
An alternative definition is that the penumbra is the region where some or all of the light source is obscured (i.e., the umbra is a subset of the penumbra).  For example, NASA's Navigation and Ancillary Information Facility defines that a body in the umbra is also within the penumbra.

Antumbra 

The antumbra (from Latin ante, "before") is the region from which the occluding body appears entirely within the disc of the light source. An observer in this region experiences an annular eclipse, in which a bright ring is visible around the eclipsing body. If the observer moves closer to the light source, the apparent size of the occluding body increases until it causes a full umbra.

See also 
 Antisolar point
 Earth's shadow

References

Optical phenomena
Shadows